Ohio's 1st congressional district is represented by Democrat Greg Landsman. The district includes the city of Cincinnati,  all of Warren County and borders the state of Kentucky. This district was once represented by President William Henry Harrison. After redistricting in 2010, the district was widely seen as heavily gerrymandered by state Republicans to protect the incumbent, Steve Chabot. Chabot lost the seat in 2022 to Democrat Greg Landsman, after redistricting unified the city of Cincinnati into the district. The city was previously split between the 1st and 2nd districts.

The district includes all of Warren County, a much more heavily Republican area. Previous iterations of the district (before 2013) did not include Warren County.

Demographics 
According to the APM Research Lab's Voter Profile Tools (featuring the U.S. Census Bureau's 2019 American Community Survey), the district contained about 551,000 potential voters (citizens, age 18+). Of these, 74% are White and 21% are Black. Immigrants make up 4% of the district's potential voters. Median income among households (with one or more potential voter) in the district is about $64,000, while 11% of households live below the poverty line. 8% of those 25 and older have not earned a high school degree, while 34% hold a bachelor's or higher degree.

Cities
Cincinnati
Springboro (partial)
Franklin
Indian Hill
St. Bernard
Mason
Lebanon
Sharonville (partial)
Middletown (partial)
Carlisle (partial)
Blue Ash
Norwood
Kenwood
Dehli
Madeira
Milford (partial)
Sycamore
Loveland
Harveysburg
Blanchester
Clearkcreek Township
Wayne Township
Turtlecreek Township
Hamilton Township
Harlan Township
Deerfield Township
Symmes Township
Montgomery
Dry Run
Anderson Township

List of members representing the district

Recent election results

2010 

Source:

2012

2014

2016

2018

2020

2022

Competitiveness
Results Under Current Lines (Since 2023)

Historical district boundaries

See also
Ohio's congressional districts
List of United States congressional districts

References

 Congressional Biographical Directory of the United States 1774–present

Further reading
 

01
Constituencies established in 1813
1813 establishments in Ohio